The South Bay Historical Railroad Society is located in Santa Clara, California and operates the Edward Peterman Museum of Railroad History in the Santa Clara Depot, as well as the Santa Clara Tower and two other buildings.

The depot is the oldest train station on the west coast.  The track in front of the depot is the former Southern Pacific, currently Union Pacific, Coast Line, and also UP's Newhall Yard, where freight trains are made up and change crews. Both passenger and freight trains pass the depot. They include Caltrain, the Altamont Corridor Express, the Amtrak Capitol Corridor, the Amtrak Coast Starlight, and various UP freight trains.

Inside the museum there is a library, artifact displays, 2 large model railroad layouts (HO and N scale), and a boardroom that is available to rent. The museum is open on Tuesdays from 5PM to 8PM, and Saturdays from 10AM to 4PM.
The Northern California Bluegrass Society (NCBS) and the South Bay Historic Railroad Society sponsor a free bluegrass and related music jam at the Edward Peterman Museum at the Santa Clara Historic Train Depot on most 2nd Saturdays of the month from 12-3pm.

See also
Caltrain Centralized Equipment Maintenance and Operations Facility
Locomotive
Heritage railway
List of heritage railways

References

External links

Home page
Northern California Bluegrass Society (SBHRS free music co-sponsor) Home page - see Jams

History of Santa Clara County, California
Railroad museums in California
Historical societies in California
Organizations based in Santa Clara, California
History of Santa Clara, California
Museums in Santa Clara, California
Model railway shows and exhibitions